Prospero Fagnani (born in Italy, place and date of birth uncertain; died 1678) was an Italian canon lawyer. Some writers place his birth in 1598, others in 1587 or in 1588.

It is certain that he studied at Perugia. At the age of twenty he was a doctor of civil and canon law; at twenty-two, secretary of the Congregation of the Council. He held this office for fifteen years. He fulfilled the same functions in several other Roman Congregations. It is not certain that he ever lectured on canon law at the Roman University (Sapienza).

He became blind at the age of forty-four. This affliction did not prevent him from devoting himself to canonical studies and from writing a commentary of the Decretals of Gregory IX, which gained for him the title of "Doctor Caecus Oculatissimus", i.e. the blind yet most far-sighted doctor. This commentary includes interpretations of the texts of the most difficult of the Decretals of Gregory IX. It is distinguished by the clearness with which the most complex and disputed questions of canon law are explained. The work is also of value for the purpose of ascertaining the practice of the Roman Congregations, especially that of the Congregation of the Council, of which the author quotes numerous decisions.

Pope Benedict XIV gave this work the highest praise, and its authority is still continually appealed to in the Roman Congregations. It is divided, like the Decretals of Gregory IX, into five books. The first edition was published at Rome, in 1661, under the title of "Jus canonicum seu commentaria absolutissima in quinque libros Decretalium". It has been reprinted several times.

Fagnani is reproached with excessive rigour in his commentary on the chapter of the Decretals "Ne innitaris" (Book I, De constitutionibus), in which he combats the doctrine of probabilism. Saint Alphonsus calls him "magnus rigoristarum princeps", the great prince of the rigorists (Homo apostolicus, Tract. I, no. 63; Theologia Moralis, IV, no. 669).

References

1678 deaths
Canon law jurists
University of Perugia alumni
Year of birth unknown
17th-century Italian lawyers
Italian jurists